Bettembourg railway station is a railway station serving Bettembourg, in southern Luxembourg.  It is operated by Chemins de Fer Luxembourgeois, the state-owned railway company.

The station is situated on Line 60, which connects Luxembourg City to the Red Lands of the south of the country.  It is the main junction for Line 60, with the line splitting into three separate branches after Bettembourg.

External links

 Official CFL page on Bettembourg station
 Rail.lu page on Bettembourg station

Railway station
Railway stations in Luxembourg
Railway stations on CFL Line 60